Riccobene is a surname of Italian origin. People with that name include:

 Harry Riccobene (1909-2000), American mobster, half-brother of Mario
 Mario Riccobene (1933-1993), American mobster, half-brother of Harry

Surnames of Italian origin